Plasmodium cnemaspi is a parasite of the genus Plasmodium subgenus Sauramoeba.

Like all Plasmodium species P. cnemaspi has both vertebrate and insect hosts. The vertebrate hosts for this parasite are lizards.

Description 

The parasite was first described by Telford in 1984.

Geographical occurrence 

This species is found in the Uluguru Mountains, Tanzania.

Clinical features and host pathology 

This species infects the lizard Cnemaspis africana.

References 

cnemaspi